Millbrook High School is a part of the Millbrook Central School System (grades 9-12). It is located in Millbrook, Dutchess County, New York. The address of the school is 70 Church Street, Millbrook, NY. Built between 2005 and 2006, and opening in September 2006, it is the newest school in the Millbrook Central School District.

Administration
Mrs. Laura Mitchell - Superintendent of Schools
Dr. Kathleen Affigne - Assistant Superintendent of Schools
Mr. Eric T. Seipp - Principal
Mr. Steven Cabello  - Assistant Principal

Academics
Millbrook has a small amount of AP Classes. A few include:

AP English Literature and Composition
AP European History
AP Geography
AP Calculus (AB/BC)

In addition Millbrook High School also offers numerous courses through DCC (Dutchess Community College) and Marist College.

Music
Millbrook High School's music curriculum is administered by Mr. Daniel Dunninger and Mrs. Jennifer Tibbetts.
The Millbrook High School Concert Band is conducted by Mr. Daniel Dunninger.  With approximately eighty students, the Millbrook Concert Band performs at a few concerts every year, in addition to playing in a music competition every spring.
The Millbrook High School Jazz Band is also conducted by Mr. Daniel Dunninger.  The Millbrook Jazz Band performs at many concerts and competitions throughout the year, both for the school and the community.  Although most of the players in the Jazz Band are drawn from the Concert Band, some students are encouraged to join the group by Daniel Dunninger.
The Millbrook High School Mixed Chorus is directed by Mrs. Jennifer Tibbetts.  Considerably larger than the Concert Band, the Mixed Chorus performs in many of the same concerts in which the Concert Band plays.
In addition to the ensembles listed above, Millbrook High School also has a select choral group, and the Madrigals, which is a mixed group.

Notable alumni

Athletics

Millbrook High School competes in Division 4 of the Mid Hudson Athletic League or MHAL along with the high schools of Coleman Catholic, Rhinebeck and Webutuck. Other member schools include Ellenville, Highland, Hyde Park (FDR), Marlboro, New Paltz, Onteora, Pine Plains, Red Hook, Roundout Valley, Saugerties, Spackenkill, and Wallkill. MHAL is Section 9 of the New York State Public High School Athletic Association or NYSPHSAA.

Baseball
Basketball (Boys' and Girls')
Cross Country (Boys' and Girls')
Cheerleading
Golf
Football
Soccer (Boys' and Girls')
Softball
Tennis (Boys')
Track, Winter and Spring
Volleyball
Wrestling
Lacrosse (Boys' and Girls')

School organizations and clubs
Drama Club
Interact Club (sponsored by Rotary International)
National Honor Society
Yearbook
AHA (Athletes Helping Athletes)
Media Club
Environment Club
Model UN
Student Council
Art Club
Book Club
Madrigals

External links 
Millbrook High School
Millbrook Central School District
New York State high schools with Wikipedia Sites 
List of high schools in New York from SchoolTree.org
Millbrook High School Statistics from SchoolTree.org

Public high schools in Dutchess County, New York